Monkeys is the 1986 debut novel of American writer Susan Minot.

Writing and development
The novel draws from Minot's real-life experiences. The novel takes the form of nine interconnected stories, a structure inspired by the works of J.D. Salinger.

Reception

Critical reception
The Kirkus Reviews review of the novel praised it, writing: "You can hear the voices of the masters--the descriptive economy of Hemingway, the imaged delicacy of Virginia Woolf, and, above all, the informing echo of J.D. Salinger [...]".

Honors
The novel won the 1987 Prix Femina étranger.

References

1986 American novels
1986 debut novels
Prix Femina Étranger winners
Novels set in Massachusetts